William Hainey (born 16 June 1939) is a Scottish former professional footballer who played as an inside forward. He played for Partick Thistle, Dundee United, St Mirren and Portadown.

Early life
Billy Hainey was born in Paisley, Renfrewshire, on 16 June 1939.

Playing career
Hainey played junior football for Johnstone Burgh before joining his first senior club, Partick Thistle, in 1961. He made 111 league appearances for Partick before he was sold to Dundee United for £8,000 in March 1966. At the beginning of the 1966–67 season, he became the first ever substitute used by Dundee United in a major competitive match, and also the first substitute to score for the club. In October 1966, Hainey scored Dundee United's first ever goal in European competition, in a 2–1 win over Barcelona in the Fairs Cup.

After losing his place in the Dundee United team, Hainey requested a transfer in October 1967. He was released on a free transfer in April 1968, later signing for St Mirren. He then joined Portadown in Northern Ireland.

Hainey was inducted into the Dundee United Hall of Fame in 2010.

References

External links

Living people
1939 births
Footballers from Paisley, Renfrewshire
Scottish footballers
Association football inside forwards
Scottish Football League players
NIFL Premiership players
Scottish Junior Football Association players
Johnstone Burgh F.C. players
Partick Thistle F.C. players
Dundee United F.C. players
St Mirren F.C. players
Portadown F.C. players
Scottish Football League representative players